The 'Langra' mango, also known as Banarasi Langra, is a mango cultivar primarily grown in Bangladesh,Varanasi, or Banaras, Northern India. In some part of northern India and in Bihar 'Langra' mango is also known as 'Malda' Mango'', referring to the town of Malda in West Bengal.

This cultivar retains a greenish tinge while ripening. It is normally harvested during mid-June to last half of July. Around 2006, it was known to be gaining popularity on the international market. It is considered suitable for slicing and canning.

Leaves

The leaf blades have an oval-lanceolate shape and are flat to slightly folded. The apexes are acuminate to sub-acuminate. The secondary veins are arranged as sub-opposite to alternate. They have been measured as follows:
 Length of blade: 21.93 cm
 Length of lamina: 18.95 cm
 Breadth of lamina: 4.75 cm
 Length petioles 2.98 cm
 Length of pulvinus region 1.20 cm
 Length : breadth of lamina: 4.00
 Length of pulvinus : petiole: 0.42
 Length of lamina : petiole: 6.67 cm

References

Further reading
 

Mango cultivars of India
Mango cultivars of Pakistan